Leaves for the Burning is Mervyn Wall's third novel, and his first non-humorous work. Set in a small town in the Irish midlands, it explores the passing of youth and opportunity and the onset of premature aging, against the backdrop of a fiercely-insular community.

References 

1952 novels
Irish bildungsromans
Novels set in Ireland
Methuen Publishing books
20th-century Irish novels
Irish comedy novels